This is a list of albums released under MBK Entertainment, formerly known as Core Contents Media.

2006

2007

2008

2009

2010

2011

2012

2013

2014

2015

2016

2017

2018

References

Discographies of South Korean record labels